Amador County is a county located in the U.S. state of California, in the Sierra Nevada. As of the 2020 census, the population was 40,474. The county seat is Jackson. Amador County, located within California's Gold Country, is known as "The Heart of the Mother Lode". There is a substantial viticultural industry in the county.

History 

Amador County was created by the California Legislature on May 11, 1854, from parts of Calaveras and El Dorado counties. It was organized on July 3, 1854. In 1864, part of the county's territory was given to Alpine County.

The county is named for José María Amador, a soldier, rancher, and miner, born in San Francisco in 1794, the son of Sergeant Pedro Amador (a Spanish soldier who settled in California in 1771) and younger brother to Sinforosa Amador.

In 1848, Jose Maria Amador, with several Native Americans, established a successful gold mining camp near the present town of Amador City. In Spanish, the word amador means "one who loves". Some of the Mother Lode's most successful gold mines were located in Amador County, including the Kennedy, Argonaut, and Keystone.

There are numerous gold mines in Amador County including the Argonaut Mine, the Kennedy Mine, the Central Eureka, and the Lincoln. The Kennedy Mine in Jackson was the deepest gold mine of its time. The federal government closed all of the Mother Lode's mines in 1942 because they were considered non-essential to the war effort.

Geography 
It is the fifth-smallest county in California by land area and second-smallest by total area. Water bodies in the county include Lake Amador, Lake Camanche, Pardee Reservoir, Bear River Reservoir, Silver Lake, Sutter Creek, Cosumnes River, Mokelumne River, and Lake Tabeaud. Thirty-seven miles of the North Fork and main Mokelumne River were added to the California Wild and Scenic Rivers System on June 27, 2018, when Governor Edmund G. "Jerry" Brown signed Senate Bill 854.

The county is bordered on the north by the Cosumnes River and El Dorado County and on the south by the Mokelumne River and Calaveras County, on the west by Sacramento and San Joaquin Counties, and the east by Alpine County.

Adjacent counties

El Dorado County – north
Alpine County – east
Calaveras County – south
San Joaquin County – southwest
Sacramento County – west

National protected area

Eldorado National Forest (part)
Mokelumne Wilderness (part)

Demographics

2020 census

Note: the US Census treats Hispanic/Latino as an ethnic category. This table excludes Latinos from the racial categories and assigns them to a separate category. Hispanics/Latinos can be of any race.

2011

Places by population, race, and income 

† County seat‡ Data for Amador County area of this CDP

† County seat‡ Data for Amador County area of this CDP

2010

The 2010 United States Census reported that Amador County had a population of 38,091. The racial makeup of Amador County was 33,149 (87.0%) White, 962 (2.5%) African American, 678 (1.8%) Native American, 419 (1.1%) Asian, 77 (0.2%) Pacific Islander, 1,450 (3.8%) from other races, and 1,356 (3.6%) from two or more races. Hispanic or Latino of any race were 4,756 persons (12.5%).

† County seat‡ Data for Amador County area of this CDP

2000 Census
As of the census of 2000, there were 35,100 people, 12,759 households, and 9,071 families residing in the county. The population density was 59 people per square mile (23/km2). There were 15,035 housing units at an average density of 25 per square mile (10/km2). The racial makeup of the county was 85.8% White, 3.9% Black or African American, 1.8% Native American, 1.0% Asian, 0.1% Pacific Islander, 5.0% from other races, and 2.4% from two or more races. 8.9% of the population were Hispanic or Latino of any race. 14.9% were of German, 12.6% English, 11.7% Irish, 8.8% Italian and 7.3% American ancestry according to Census 2000. 93.1% spoke English and 5.1% Spanish as their first language.

There were 12,759 households, out of which 26.2% had children under the age of 18 living with them, 58.9% were married couples living together, 8.7% had a female householder with no husband present, and 28.9% were non-families. 23.9% of all households were made up of individuals, and 11.3% had someone living alone who was 65 years of age or older. The average household size was 2.39 and the average family size was 2.81.

In the county, the population was spread out, with 20.6% under the age of 18, 6.9% from 18 to 24, 26.2% from 25 to 44, 28.3% from 45 to 64, and 18.0% who were 65 years of age or older. The median age was 43 years. For every 100 females there were 122.5 males. For every 100 females age 18 and over, there were 123.4 males.

The median income for a household in the county was $42,280, and the median income for a family was $51,226. Males had a median income of $39,697 versus $28,850 for females. The per capita income for the county was $22,412. About 6.1% of families and 9.2% of the population were below the poverty line, including 13.1% of those under age 18 and 5.4% of those age 65 or over.

Economy

The Shenandoah Valley was once the principal viticultural region of California though not as well known as the Napa Valley AVA or Sonoma Valley AVA viticultural regions. With the discovery of gold, the area quickly became a mecca for those trying to make their fortune. In the process numerous wineries sprouted up, many of whose vineyards are still in use by wineries today. The decline of the California Gold Rush coupled with the onset of Prohibition devastated the wine-making region of Amador County. Today this area has been resurrected and is now home to over 40 different wineries. Amador County is known for its Zinfandel, but many other varietals are produced as well. Amador County has a high percentage of old Zinfandel vines. Some of the Zinfandel vineyards in this county are more than 125 years old, including the original Grandpère vineyard, planted with Zinfandel before 1869 and believed to be the oldest Zinfandel vineyard in America. This  vineyard is home to some of the oldest Zinfandel vines on earth, with proof of their existence dating to 1869 when it was listed as a descriptor on a deed from the U.S. Geological Survey. A grant deed in Amador County records further proves their existence in 1869.

Politics, government, and policing

County Supervisors
The county is governed by a five-person elected Board of Supervisors and a County Administrator. The county seat is Jackson.

Policing
The unincorporated areas of Amador County are patrolled by the county sheriff's department who also operates the county jail and protects the courts. Municipal police departments within the county are at Ione, Jackson, and Sutter Creek.

Voter registration statistics

Cities by population and voter registration

Politics

Crime 

The following table includes the number of incidents reported and the rate per 1,000 persons for each type of offense.

Cities by population and crime rates

Education 

Due to the low population of the area, there are few schools with small class sizes. In total for public schools, there are two high schools, two junior high schools, and six elementary schools. These numbers are in addition to two independent study schools, one charter school, and one continuing education school for adults. There are no colleges or universities within the county's borders.

In popular culture
"The Luck of Roaring Camp" is a short story by American author Bret Harte. It was first published in the August 1868 issue of the Overland Monthly and helped push Harte to international prominence. Harte lived in this area during his "Gold Rush" period, and possibly based the story in a mining camp on the Mokelumne River.

In the 1993 movie Homeward Bound: The Incredible Journey, a map of Amador County is shown, as well as many other California counties.

Transportation

Major highways 

  State Route 16
  State Route 26
  State Route 49
  State Route 88
  State Route 104
  State Route 124

Public transportation 

Amador Transit provides service in Jackson and nearby communities. Connections to Calaveras County and Sacramento are additionally provided.

Airport 

Amador County Airport is a general aviation airport located near Jackson.

Communities

Cities
 Amador City
 Ione
 Jackson (county seat)
 Plymouth
 Sutter Creek

Unincorporated communities

 Amador Pines
 Barton
 Bonnefoy
 Buckhorn
 Buena Vista
 Camanche North Shore
 Camanche Village
 Carbondale
 Clinton
 Drytown
 Electra
 Enterprise
 Fiddletown
 Kirkwood
 Kit Carson
 Lockwood
 Martell
 New Chicago
 Pine Acres
 Pine Grove
 Pioneer
 Red Corral
 River Pines
 Roaring Camp
 Scottsville
 Sunnybrook
 Sutter Hill
 Volcano

See also 
 California State Library – California Room Collection. Amador County Legal Records, 1853–1868.
 List of school districts in Amador County, California
 National Register of Historic Places listings in Amador County, California
 Amador High School

Notes

References

External links 

 

 
1854 establishments in California
California counties
Populated places established in 1854